Sea Fog (Haemoo) is a 2014 South Korean film directed by Shim Sung-bo. The film is adapted from the 2007 stage play Haemoo, which in turn was based on the true story of 25 Korean-Chinese illegal immigrants who suffocated to death in the storage tank of the fishing vessel Taechangho; their bodies were dumped by the ship's crew into the sea southwest of Yeosu on October 7, 2001.

It was selected as the South Korean entry for the Best Foreign Language Film at the 87th Academy Awards and the 72nd Golden Globe Awards, but was not nominated.

Plot
The 69-ton fishing vessel Jeonjinho fails to catch as much fish as its crew had hoped. To make more money, the crew decides to smuggle thirty illegal immigrants into Korea. But things don't go according to plan when the Jeonjinho encounters heavy fog, rain and waves on its return journey, while also being chased by a ship from the South Korean Maritime Police. On orders from the captain, several crew members hide the illegal immigrants inside the fishing tank, where they are in danger of suffocating to death. Amid the chaos, the youngest crew member Dong-sik tries to protect a young female migrant with whom he'd fallen in love.

Cast
Kim Yoon-seok as Captain Cheol-joo
Park Yoochun as Dong-sik
Lee Hee-joon as Chang-wook
Moon Sung-keun as Chief engineer Wan-ho
Kim Sang-ho as Boatswain Ho-young
Yoo Seung-mok as Kyung-gu
Han Ye-ri as Hong-mae
Jung In-gi as Oh-nam
Kim Young-woong as Gil-soo
Ye Soo-jung as Dong-shik's grandmother
Yeom Hye-ran as Shipowner's wife

Production
Sea Fog is the first feature film directed by Shim Sung-bo, who co-wrote the screenplay of Memories of Murder with director Bong Joon-ho. Bong is this film's producer.

Kim Yoon-seok was first cast in the role of the ship's captain in June 2013. Song Joong-ki was originally offered to star opposite Kim, but had to turn down the role when he received his enlistment papers for mandatory military service. K-pop singer and actor Park Yoochun was cast instead in August 2013, in his big screen debut. Filming began on October 6, 2013, with locations in Masan, Goyang, Busan and Ulsan, and ended on March 6, 2014.

The first official press conference was held on July 1, 2014.

Box office 
Sea Fog was released in South Korea on August 13, 2014. It reached 1,084,375 admissions after one week.

Critical reception 
The review aggregator Rotten Tomatoes reported that 77% of critics have given the film a positive review based on 13 reviews, with an average rating of 6.17/10. On Metacritic, the film has a weighted average score of 61 out of 100 based on 6 critic reviews, indicating "generally favorable reviews". The Hollywood Reporter described the film as "A possible riveting nightmare fogged up by concessions to blockbuster conventions." It praised Hong Kyung-pyo's cinematography and Lee Ha-joon's production design as "effective in highlighting the differences between the lands of vast, cold port and the unforgiving environments of the sea and cramped insides of the fishing boat," but criticized director Shim Sung-bo's lack of subtlety and reflection, "with Haemoo subscribing to many of the conventions of both disaster epics and revenge drama, and the over-dependence of a central seaborne romance."

Variety wrote, "Turning a real-life human trafficking tragedy into a comment on social inequality and the cost of survival, Haemoo dramatizes a stark nautical ordeal fraught with tension. Produced and co-written by internationally recognized Korean auteur Bong Joon-ho (Snowpiercer, The Host) this directing debut by helmer-scribe Shim Sung-bo echoes Bong's trademark cynical vision of human nature, but the characters lack dimensionality and psychological depth."

International release 
Sea Fog made its international premiere at the 2014 Toronto International Film Festival. It was also invited to the following: 
 2014 Toronto International Film Festival
 2014 Vancouver International Film Festival 
 2014 San Sebastián International Film Festival
 2014 Taoyuan International Film Festival
 2014 Busan International Film Festival
 2014 Fantastic Fest 
 2014 Festival du Film Coréen à Paris
 2014 Hawaii International Film Festival
 2014 Hong Kong Asian Film Festival
 2014 Stockholm International Film Festival
 2014 London Korean Film Festival
 2014 American Film Institute Festival 
 2014 Philippines Cinema One Originals Festival under the Asian Gem category
 2014 Mar del Plata International Film Festival
 2014 Madrid Premiere Week
 2014 Tallinn Black Nights Film Festival
 2014 Marrakech International Film Festival
 2014 Filmasia Festival in Prague
 2014 Dubai International Film Festival
 2015 Palm Springs International Film Festival
 2015 Fantasporto Oporto International Film Festival
 2015 Santa Barbara International Film Festival
 2015 Annual Waimea Town Celebration
 2015 New Directors/New Films Festival in New York City
 2015 Florence Korea Film Festival in Italy
 2015 Brussels International Fantastic Film Festival
 2015 Beaune International Thriller Film Festival
 2015 Art Film Fest in Slovakia

The film's rights were also pre-sold at the Cannes Film Market to Taiwan, Hong Kong, Singapore, Japan and France. Its Japanese release was scheduled for early 2015 while Taiwan and Singapore released the movie at the end of 2014.

Awards and nominations

See also
 List of submissions to the 87th Academy Awards for Best Foreign Language Film
 List of South Korean submissions for the Academy Award for Best Foreign Language Film

References

External links

South Korean drama films
Films shot in Busan
Crime films based on actual events
South Korean films based on plays
2010s Korean-language films
Next Entertainment World films
South Korean thriller films
Films produced by Bong Joon-ho
Films with screenplays by Bong Joon-ho
2014 drama films
2010s South Korean films